Hans Ansgar Ostrom (born January 29, 1954) is an American professor, writer, editor, and scholar. Ostrom is a Professor of African American Studies and English the University of Puget Sound (1983–present), where he teaches courses on African-American literature, creative writing, and poetry as a genre. He is known for his authorship of various books on African-American studies and creative writing, and novels including Three to Get Ready, Honoring Juanita, and Without One, as well as The Coast Starlight: Collected Poems 1976–2006.

Early life
Ostrom was born in Sierra City, California, on January 19, 1954. Ostrom attended Sierra Community College for two years, then transferred to University of California, Davis, where he completed his B.A. (1977) and M.A. (1982) with a major in English. He completed his Ph.D. in English in 1982, also from University of California, Davis (UC Davis). Ostrom began teaching composition at (UC Davis in 1987, and taught American Studies and English language courses at Gutenberg University in Germany.

Career
Ostrom's poetry has appeared in American and British literary journals since 1979. Praise for Ostrom's work includes recognition from Pulitzer Prize-winning poet Karl Shapiro, who characterized the poems in The Coast Starlight: Collected Poems 1979–2006 as "genuine American poetry at its best". With Wendy Bishop, Ostrom edited an influential collection of essays on teaching creative writing: Colors of a Different Horse: Rethinking Creative Writing Theory and Pedagogy. His published fiction includes the mystery novel Three to Get Ready (1991), which is being adapted to film under the title Napa, starring Rose McGowan.

In the field of African-American studies, Ostrom's academic publications include two books on Langston Hughes – Langston Hughes: A Study of the Short Fiction and A Langston Hughes Encyclopedia – as well as the five-volume Greenwood Encyclopedia of African American Studies, co-edited with J. David Macey.

Ostrom has also published articles on the works of Rudolph Fisher, Elizabeth Bishop, William Blake, and George Meredith. Ostrom's poems and short fiction have appeared in a variety of journals and anthologies. He has published three novels: Three to Get Ready, Honoring Juanita, and Without One, as well as The Coast Starlight: Collected Poems 1976–2006.

Recognition
President's Award for Outstanding Teaching at the University of Puget Sound.
Fulbright Lecturer, Uppsala University of Puget Sound.

Works 
 The Coast Starlight: Collected Poems 1976-2006 (Indianapolis: Dog Ear Publishing, 2006) 
 Honoring Juanita (Congruent Angle Press, 2010).
 Co-editor, with J. David Macey, The Greenwood Encyclopedia of African American Literature (Westport: Greenwood Press, 2005): 5 volumes.
 A Langston Hughes Encyclopedia (Westport: Greenwood Press, 2002);
 Langston Hughes: A Study of the Short Fiction (New York: Twayne, 1993);
 With Wendy Bishop and Katharine Haake, Metro: Journeys in Writing Creatively (New York: Longman, 2001)
 Subjects Apprehended (Johnstown, Ohio: Pudding House Press, 2000);
 Three to Get Ready (Oakland: Cliffhanger, 1991).
Co-editor, with Wendy Bishop, The Subject Is Story: Essays for Writers and Readers (Boyton-Cook/Heineman, 2003).
 "To War Again" (poem), Perspectives: A Journal of Reformed Thought 
 "The Green Bird" (short story), Ploughshares (Winter 1986)
 "Guest Post: Hans Ostrom on the Next Decade in Book Culture", Critical Mass, January 8, 2010
 Without One: A Novel (Congruent Angle Press, 2012).
 With William Haltom, Orwell's "Politics and the English Language" in the Age of Pseudocracy, New York: Routledge/Taylor & Francis, 2018. 
 With Wendy Bishop, Colors of a Different Horse: Rethinking Creative Writing Theory and Pedagogy. Urbana: National Council of Teachers of English, 1994.

References

Sources 
 "Hans Ostrom", Contemporary Authors, New Series, Vol. 43 (Detroit: Gale Research, 1998)
 Choice, December 1993, review of Langston Hughes: A Study of the Short Fiction, p. 605
 S. A. Vega Garcia, Choice, October 2002, review of A Langston Hughes Encyclopedia, p. 257
 Review of The Greenwood Encyclopedia of African American Literature, Library Journal, 2005
 Review of The Greenwood Encyclopedia of African American Literature, School Library Journal, March 2005
 "Hans Ostrom", in Directory of American Poets and Fiction Writers (New York: Poets and Writers, 1998–present)
 Wendy Bishop, Thirteen Ways of Looking for a Poem (New York: Longman, 1999); includes several poems by Ostrom
 Will Hochman, "The Ongoing Legacy of Wendy Bishop Is In Our Stories: Review of The Subject is Story: Essays for Writers and Readers, Edited by Wendy Bishop and Hans Ostrom", Across the Disciplines: Interdisciplinary Perspectives on Language, Literature, and Writing (2004) 
 David Herbert Donald, "Good Race Men: Review of Short Stories of Langston Hughes", The New York Times, September 1, 1996
 Greenwood Press: Greenwood Encyclopedia of African American Literature (2005), edited by Hans Ostrom and J David Macey: excerpts from multiple reviews: http://www.greenwood.com/catalog/GR2972.aspx
 ERIC abstract of Colors of a Different Horse: Rethinking Creative Writing Theory and Pedagogy, edited by Wendy Bishop and Hans Ostrom. 
 Law and Society in the 21st Century: conference held at Humboldt University, Berlin, Germany, July 2007.
 Rita Dove, "Poet's Choice", Washington Post (column by Rita Dove), May 20, 2001, includes "Emily Dickinson and Elvis Presley in Heaven", a poem by Hans Ostrom.

1954 births
American academics of English literature
Academic staff of Johannes Gutenberg University Mainz
Journalists from California
Living people
People from Grass Valley, California
People from Sierra County, California
University of California, Davis alumni